Mitja Mežnar (born 30 June 1988 in Kranj) is a Slovenian ski jumper who has competed since 2003. At the 2010 Winter Olympics in Vancouver, he finished eighth in the team large hill and 29th in the individual large hill events.

At the FIS Nordic World Ski Championships 2009 in Liberec, Mežnar finished eighth in the team large hill, 31st in the individual normal hill, and 47th in the individual large hill events.

His best World Cup finish was fifth in the team large hill event in Finland in March 2010.

References

1988 births
Living people
Olympic ski jumpers of Slovenia
Ski jumpers at the 2010 Winter Olympics
Slovenian male ski jumpers
Sportspeople from Kranj
Universiade medalists in ski jumping
Universiade bronze medalists for Slovenia
Competitors at the 2013 Winter Universiade
Competitors at the 2015 Winter Universiade
21st-century Slovenian people